Nowellia curvifolia is a species of liverwort belonging to the family Cephaloziaceae.

Synonyms:
 Cephalozia curvifolia (Dicks.) Dumort. 
 Jungermannia curvifolia Dicks.

References

Cephaloziaceae
Taxa named by James Dickson (botanist)